Jask-e Kohneh (also Romanized as Jāsk-e Kohneh; also known as Juna) is a village in Jask Rural District, in the Central District of Jask County, Hormozgan Province, Iran. At the 2006 census, its population was 899, in 200 families.

References 

 Populated places in Jask County